David A. Weiner (pronounced Why-ner) is an American filmmaker, magazine editor, and journalist.

He wrote and directed the In Search of Darkness trilogy, which explores the decade of '80s horror cinema over the course of 14-plus hours: the long-form 2019 documentary film In Search of Darkness, and its sequels In Search of Darkness: Part II (2020) and In Search of Darkness: Part III (2022). He also wrote and directed the five-hour 2022 documentary on '80s Sci-Fi cinema, In Search of Tomorrow. 

Weiner was a contributor to The Hollywood Reporter's Heat Vision and LA Weekly, and was a senior editor for Entertainment Tonight Online from 2001 to 2014.  

He was the executive editor of Famous Monsters of Filmland from 2015 to 2016, which resulted in him winning the Rondo Hatton Award for Best Interview of the Year in 2015 (for his interview with Mel Brooks for the 40th anniversary of Young Frankenstein), as well as winning the award for Best Classic Magazine (for Famous Monsters of Filmland) two years in a row. 

After graduating from film school at New York's Ithaca College in 1990, Weiner started his entertainment career in Los Angeles working in various on-set production capacities in film, television, commercials, and music videos. He moved on to film development and script coverage/story analyst jobs, and navigated the dot-com boom and bust in the mid-to-late '90s at AOL's Entertainment Asylum, Scour.com, and Hollywood.com before spending over a decade covering film, television, music, and breaking celebrity news at Entertainment Tonight. Weiner on why he creates long-form genre documentaries:

“These films are like the nostalgia of a sense memory, or an unexpected song that takes you back to one of the best times in your life. Revisiting, discussing, and celebrating these films in a long-form documentary time-capsule format is one of the greatest ways to keep the spark alive for so many beloved films.”

- David A. Weiner, Forbes, October 12, 2022

Selected filmography

References

External links

Living people
American documentary film directors
American magazine editors
American magazine journalists
American online journalists
Year of birth missing (living people)